Changdeokgung (Hangul: 창덕궁, Hanja: 昌德宮; literally, "The Palace of Prospering Virtue"), also known as Changdeokgung Palace or Changdeok Palace, is set within a large park in Jongno District, Seoul, South Korea. It is one of the "Five Grand Palaces" built by the kings of the Joseon dynasty (1392–1897). As it is located east of Gyeongbok Palace, Changdeokgung—along with Changgyeonggung—is also referred to as the "East Palace" (동궐, 東闕, Donggwol).

Changdeokgung was the most favored palace of many Joseon kings and retained many elements dating from the Three Kingdoms of Korea period that were not incorporated in the more contemporary Gyeongbokgung. One such element is the fact that the buildings of Changdeokgung blend with the natural topography of the site instead of imposing themselves upon it. Like the other Five Grand Palaces in Seoul, it was heavily damaged during the Japanese occupation of Korea (1910–1945). Currently, only about 30% of the pre-Japanese structures of the East Palace Complex (Changdeokgung together with Changgyeonggung) survive.

History
Changdeokgung was the second palace after Gyeongbokgung which had been established in 1395 as a primary palace. In the midst of strife for the throne between princes and vassals, authority of Gyeongbokgung was deteriorated. King Jeongjong enthroned by Prince Jeong-an (Yi Bang-won, later became King Taejong) moved the capital to Gaegyeong, the capital of the Goryeo dynasty, again in 1400 on the pretext of its superior geographical features, but in fact, to avert a power struggle. King Taejong (Yi Bang-won) soon taking over the throne returned to Hanseong (present-day Seoul) had a new palace named Changdeokgung instead of Gyeongbokgung because he had killed his half brothers in Gyeongbokgung whose construction was led by Jeong Do-jeon, the king's rival before. Construction of Changdeok Palace began in 1405, and was completed in 1412. King Seonjo expanded the palace grounds by about 500,000 square meters, including Huwon (see below).

The palace was burnt to the ground during the Japanese invasion in 1592 and reconstructed in 1609 by King Seonjo and King Gwanghaegun. The palace burned down again in 1623 because of King Injo a political Revolt against Gwanghaegun. The palace was also attacked by the Manchu Qing but throughout its history of reconstruction and repair has remained faithful to its original design. Changdeokgung was the site of the royal court and the seat of government until 1868, when the neighboring Gyeongbokgung was rebuilt. Korea's last Emperor, Sunjong lived here until his death in 1926.

Parts of the palace (notably Nakseon-jae hall) continued to function as a royal residence up to 1989, when both Princess Deokhye and Crown Princess Bangja died. Other post-WWII residents included Empress Sunjeong (Sunjong's second wife), Crown Prince Yi Un, his son Yi Gu and Yi Gu's wife Julia Mullock. However, residence in the palace in the post-war period was at the whim of the republican leaders, and after the Korean liberation in 1945 it would take the resignation of Rhee Syngman for former imperial family members to be allowed back in.

Today there are 13 buildings remaining on the palace grounds and 28 pavilions in the gardens, occupying 110 acres (45 hectares) in all and the area is designated as Historical Site No. 122. Buildings of note include Donhwamun (built in 1412, rebuilt in 1607, with a copper bell weighing 9 short tons or 8 metric tons), Injeongjeon (main hall), Seongjeongjeon (auxiliary office in the main hall), Huijeongdang (the king's private residence, later used as a conference hall), Daejojeon (living quarters), and Nakseon-jae.

Structures 

The palace was built between Peak Maebong of Mt. Bugaksan in the back and River Geumcheon having flowing in the front influenced by the principle "baesanimsu" (배산임수, lit. 'back to hill, face to water') in Feng Shui theory. Contrary to Gyeongbokgung whose main buildings are arranged in accurate architectural principle, however, buildings in Changdeokgung are disposed more freely without a regular system. Though its structure seems chaotic at a glance, all buildings are in harmony with the environment surrounding them.

Changdeokgung consists of governmental area (치조, 治朝, chijo) centering on Injeongjeon and Seonjeongjeon, royal private area (침전, 寢殿, chimjeon, meaning 'a house of king's bedroom'), Nakseonjae area in the east, and Huwon beyond the north hills. Most of major official buildings such as Injeongjeon, main hall of Changdeokgung, Seonjeongjeon, king's office, and many of government offices (궐내각사, 闕內各司, gwollaegaksa) are placed in the front parts of the palace, beyond which there are royal private court  for king and queen. King's houses like Seonjeongjeon, Huijeongdang, and Nakseonjae are surrounded in many folds of buildings and courts in case any outsider break through. The architectural style of Changdeokgung overall features simplicity and frugality because of Confucian ideology.

Structures of particular interest include:

 Donhwamun Gate – The main palace gate. Built in 1412, Donhwamun has a two-story pavilion-type wooden structure, and is the largest of all palace gates. Donhwamun was burned down during the Japanese invasion of 1592 and was restored in 1608. 
 Geumcheongyo Bridge  – Oldest bridge still extant in Seoul. Built 1411.
 Injeongjeon Hall (National Treasure) – The throne hall of Changdeokgung, it was used for major state affairs including the coronation of a new king and receiving foreign envoys. Originally built in 1405, it was rebuilt in 1610 after being burned down during the 1592 Japanese invasion, and a third time in 1804 after being destroyed by a fire. 
 Seonjeongjeon Hall – An office for ruling officials. The king held daily meetings with ministers, reported on state affairs and seminars here.
 Huijeongdang Hall – Originally the king's bed chamber, it became his workplace after Seonjeongjeon was deemed too small for conducting routine state affairs. The original Huijeongdang was destroyed by a fire in 1917. The reconstructed structure is completely different from the original due to recent Western influences. Wooden floorboards and carpets, glass windows, and chandeliers can be seen inside the building.
 Daejojeon Hall – Official residence of the queen. Destroyed by fire in 1917, it was rebuilt with materials taken from Gyeongbokgung. Daejojeon was used as a residence for the last empress of Joseon, allowing us a glimpse into the final years of the royal household of the Joseon dynasty. 
 Juhamnu Pavilion (Kyujanggak) – Royal libraries stood in this area. State exams were conducted in front of the pavilion on special occasions in presence of the king. 
 Yeon-gyeongdang Residence – Built in 1827, it was an audience hall modeled after a typical literati house.

Huwon

Behind the palace lies the 78-acre (32 ha) Huwon (후원, 後苑, Rear garden) which was originally constructed for the use of the royal family and palace women. The garden incorporates a lotus pond, pavilions, and landscaped lawns, trees, and flowers. There are over 26,000 specimens of a hundred different species of trees in the garden and some of the trees behind the palace are over 300 years old. The garden for the private use of the king had been called 'Geumwon' (금원, 禁苑, Forbidden garden) because even high officials were not allowed to enter without the king's permission. It had also been called 'Naewon' (내원, 內苑, 'Inner garden'). Today Koreans often call it 'Biwon' (비원, 秘院, Secret garden) which derived from the office of same name in the late 19th century. Though the garden had many other names, the one most frequently used through Joseon dynasty period was 'Huwon'.

In September 2012, the Buyongjeong pavilion in the garden was re-opened after a year-long restoration project. The pavilion was restored based on the Donggwoldo from 1820, National Treasures of South Korea No. 249.

A variety of ceremonies hosted by the king were held in Huwon. In the early period of the Joseon dynasty, military inspections in which the king participated were often held here. King Sejo had troops parade and array before him or commanded them by himself in the garden. In addition, feasts were given, archery tournaments held, and fireworks enjoyed in Huwon.

The Ongnyucheon (옥류천, 玉流川, "Jade Stream") area is of particular interest. It contains a U-shaped water channel carved in 1636 for floating wine cups, with a small waterfall and an inscribed poem on the boulder above it. The area also contains five small pavilions.

World Heritage
Changdeokgung was added to the UNESCO World Heritage List in 1997. The UNESCO committee stated the place was an "outstanding example of Far Eastern palace architecture and garden design" being exceptional because the buildings are "integrated into and harmonized with the natural setting" and adapted "to the topography and retaining indigenous tree cover."

Portions of the palace were used to film the hugely popular Korean drama Dae Jang Geum in the first decade of the 21st century.

Event
From April to October 2018, Changdeok Palace hosted the 2018 Changdeok Palace moonlight tour. Changdeok Palace moonlight tours are special events where visitors can experience life at the palace. It typically took about two hours and starts at Donhwamun Gate, the main gate of Changdeok Palace, at 8 p.m.

Gallery

References

Bibliography

 Choi, Jong-deok (최종덕) (2006), Changdeokgung: the true palace of Joseon (조선의 참 궁궐 창덕궁), Seoul: Nulwa. 

 Yoon, Jong-soon (1992), Beautiful Seoul, Seoul: Sung Min Publishing House. PP. 4–51 are particularly relevant; each building has a picture and a historical description.
 Changdeokgung Palace, undated pamphlet available at the palace

External links

 UNESCO: Changdeokgung Palace Complex
 Changdeokgung
 Official guide from Cultural Heritage Administration
 Changdeokgung : Official Seoul City Tourism
 Life in Korea: Changdeok Palace / Biwon Garden
 Photo gallery
 The Seoul Guide : Changdeokgung Palace

Palaces in South Korea
Gardens in South Korea
Jongno District
Joseon dynasty works
Royal residences in South Korea
Tourist attractions in Seoul
World Heritage Sites in South Korea